The 2017 Liga 3 Special Region of Yogyakarta season is the third edition of Liga 3 Special Region of Yogyakarta is a qualifying round of the 2017 Liga 3. Gama F.C. are the defending champions.

The competition scheduled starts in April 2017.

Teams
This season there are 10 club will participate the league.

References 

2017 in Indonesian football
Special Region of Yogyakarta